Carlota De Camargo Nascimento (Loty) (October 7, 1904 – July 2, 1974) was a Brazilian sculptor and poet.  She signed her works as Loty. Loty was one of the first female sculptors in Brazil.

Loty was born in Sergipe, Aracaju, Brazil. She studied in Escola Nacional de Belas Artes under  Rodolfo Bernardelli (1852–1931).  Loty had one son, Joaquim Carlos de Camargo Costa,. She died, aged 69, in Rio de Janeiro.
 
Loty's name is included in the Brazilian Dictionary of Artists (Dicionário Brasileiro de Artistas Plásticos)  and in the bibliography of the Art Exhibitions (Salões de Artes Brasileiros) of the 1930s, 1940s and 1950s.
 
Loty received the Golden, the Silver and the Bronze Medals of the Salão Nacional de Belas Artes. 
 
In 1931, Loty participated in the Salão of 31, a fine arts exhibition for modern artists.  Its director, Lucio Costa, made these remarks about Loty:There is a young artist for whom I reserve a special reference for the great effort and admirable proof of talent: it is Carlota de Camargo Nascimento. Carlota is present in the Salon with a painting of a lady, a head of a child, a bust of a yound lady, two nude studies, all build with sobriety and beauty, and perfect knowledge of the technique. She also brought to the Salon two small nude studies enveloped in a very fine feeling, a harmony similar to that with which the French sculptors treat their subject. These are works that force sculpture to go further to more daring experiments, and Carlota should prepare more pieces, in the same vein, but in larger scale for the next Salons. (VIEIRA, Lucia Gouvêa, Salão de 1931. Marco da revelação da arte moderna em nível nacional. LotyLoty's closest friends included Oswaldo Teixeira, painter and director of Museu Nacional de Belas Artes; the poet Olegário Mariano , who composed the verses for one of her sculptures;  Gilka Machado; José Pancetti  and Portuguese sculptors, Teixeira Lopes.

Main works 

 Jaguarary ( 1933; inspired in the poem "Jaguarary" by Olegário Mariano - four verses are at the bottom of the work).
 Cacique (1950) (sold to Uruguay).
 Ritmo Eterno
 Fim da Jornada (1944)
 Banco da Vieira Souto
 Banco da Praça XV
 Meio-dia – worker resting at midday
 Bust of artist Sarah Villela de Figueiredo
 Bust of Bertha Lutz
 Bust of poet Gilka Machado
 Head of Child – son of painter Mário de Murtas
 Bust of Joaquim Carlos
 Bust of Joaquim Carlos.
 Bust of Roma
 Bust of Guimas.
 Bust of Chinese Girl
 Bust of Ludwig van Beethoven
 Christ
 Caricatures in porcelain “O Amigo da Onça” - Teatro Municipal
 Bust of Franz Liszt

References 

 AYALA, Walmir (org.) Dicionário Brasileiro de Artistas Plásticos. Brasília: Instituto Nacional do Livro, 1973.
 VIEIRA, Lucia Gouvêa, Salão de 1931. Marco da revelação da arte moderna em nível nacional. Rio de Janeiro; FUNARTE/Instituto de Artes Plásticas, 1984.
 Medalhas de Prata e Ouro no Salão Nacional de Belas Artes (Anos 30 e 50)
 Fonte: SIQUEIRA, Dylla R. 42 Anos De Premiações Nos Salões Oficiais, 1934-1976. Rio de Janeiro: FUNARTE, 1980. p. 21-24,

See also 
 Núcleo Bernardelli
 Oswaldo Teixeira
 Olegário Mariano
 Gilka Machado
 José Pancetti
 António Teixeira Lopes
 Casa-Museu Teixeira Lopes
 Medalhas de Prata e Ouro no Salão Nacional de Belas Artes (Anos 30 e 50)

Brazilian women sculptors